Aslan Karatsev was the defending champion, but was defeated in the final by Tobias Kamke 6–4, 6–2.

Seeds

Draw

Finals

Top half

Bottom half

References
 Main Draw
 Qualifying Draw

Kazan Kremlin Cup - Singles
Kazan Kremlin Cup
2016 in Russian tennis